Victorino Ramos Fernandes (29 March 1896 – 2 March 1983) was a Brazilian water polo player. He competed in the men's tournament at the 1920 Summer Olympics.

References

External links
 

1896 births
1983 deaths
Brazilian male water polo players
Olympic water polo players of Brazil
Water polo players at the 1920 Summer Olympics
Water polo players from Rio de Janeiro (city)